Grange hall is a meeting place of fraternal organization The National Grange of the Order of Patrons of Husbandry in the United States.
List of Grange Hall buildings, list of buildings of aforementioned meeting places

Grange Hall may also refer to:

Buildings
Grange Hall (Murphysboro, Illinois)
Grange Hall (Wilton, Connecticut)
Grange Hall (West Tisbury, Massachusetts)

Places
Grange Hall, Lake County, Illinois
Grange Hall, Ohio

See also
Granger Hall (disambiguation)
Grange Hill (disambiguation)